Jill Kvamme-Schau  (born 20 August 1948) is a Norwegian artistic gymnast. 

She was born in Bergen. She competed at the 1968 Summer Olympics and the 1972 Summer Olympics.

References

External links 
 

1948 births
Living people
Sportspeople from Bergen
Norwegian female artistic gymnasts
Olympic gymnasts of Norway
Gymnasts at the 1968 Summer Olympics
Gymnasts at the 1972 Summer Olympics
20th-century Norwegian women